Pedro Ernesto Jeanine Portillo (born 4 September 1993) is a Panamanian professional footballer who plays as a defensive midfielder for Unión Deportivo Universitario. He made his Panama senior international debut in August 2014.

Club career 
Jeanine started playing for San Francisco FC at the age of 13 where he came through the youth ranks and eventually debuted with the first team on 26 April 2010. So far he has led his team to two national titles (one league and one cup) making him the youngest Panamanian captain to having achieved this.

International career 
Jeanine was called up to the senior national team for a friendly match against Peru on 6 August 2014. He made his debut in the starting eleven; Panama lost 3–0.

At the 2015 Pan American Games in Toronto, Jeanine led the Panama national U23 team to a 4th place, after losing to Brazil 3-1.

Honors

Club

San Francisco FC 
 Copa Cable Onda Satelital Apertura Champions (1): 2015
 Apertura 2014 Champions (1): 2014
 Apertura 2010 Reserves Champions (1): 2010

References

External links
 

1993 births
Living people
Sportspeople from Panama City
Panamanian footballers
Panama international footballers
Association football midfielders
San Francisco F.C. players
Footballers at the 2015 Pan American Games
Pan American Games competitors for Panama